Benson Kipruto (born 17 March 1991) is a Kenyan long-distance runner. He won the 125th Boston Marathon in 2021 (2:09:51) and the 2022 Chicago Marathon in a personal best of 2:04:24. Kipruto also won the 2018 Toronto Marathon (2:05:13) and the 2021 Prague Marathon (2:10:16).

Personal bests
 Half marathon – 1:00:06 (Prague 2020)
 Marathon – 2:04:24 (Chicago 2022)

References

External links
Benson KIPRUTO | Profile | World Athletics

1991 births
Living people
Boston Marathon male winners
Chicago Marathon male winners
Kenyan male marathon runners